Chechen Autonomous Oblast, or Autonomous Oblast of Chechnya, was an autonomous oblast of the Russian SFSR, created on November 30, 1922 when it was separated from the Mountain Autonomous Soviet Socialist Republic. From 16 October 1924 it belonged to the North Caucasus Krai.

On January 15, 1934, the Chechen and Ingush Autonomous Oblasts were merged to form the Chechen–Ingush Autonomous Oblast.

References

Autonomous oblasts of the Soviet Union
History of Chechnya
Politics of Chechnya
States and territories established in 1922
1922 establishments in Russia
1934 disestablishments in the Soviet Union
States and territories disestablished in 1934